The Devotions are an American doo-wop group. Their single of a novelty song called "Rip Van Winkle" was released in 1961 on Delta Records; the tune was re-released on Roulette Records in 1962 and again on Roulette in 1963. The song became a hit on its third release, peaking as high as No. 36 on the Billboard Hot 100 in 1964.

Members
Bob Weisbrod
Ray Sanchez
Andy Sanchez
Bob Hovorka
Frank Pardo
Joe Pardo
Eugene McCaffery
Daniel DeMauro
Joe Del Pizzo
Al Vieco
Joe Spano
Phil Russo

References

Musical groups from New York (state)